Justin Murphy is a Rugby League coach who is the head coach of Saint-Estève XIII Catalan in FFR Elite One Championship; previously coaching Toulon Métropole XIII in the Elite Two Championship, and a former professional rugby league footballer who played for France at international level and in the NRL and Super League competitions.

Background
Murphy was born in Sydney, New South Wales, Australia.
Grew up in Narrabri where he started playing Rugby League before going to board at St Johns College Woodlawn a renowned rugby league nursery. In year 9 he started at St Mary’s College Toowoomba where he would finish his schooling.

Playing career
While with the Brisbane Broncos, he also played for the Past Brothers in the Queensland Cup.

Murphy played for the New Zealand Warriors on the wing in their 2002 NRL Grand Final loss to the Sydney Roosters.

Murphy joined the Catalans Dragons club at the end of 2004 when the club was in the national French competition. He quickly established himself as one of the better players, topping the try scoring charts and helping the club become the first French team to go through a season without defeat, winning the Coupe de France and the French championship where he was man of the match in the Final. It was his first full season in Super League that saw him shoot to prominence. He finished as Top try-scorer in 2006's Super League XI with 26 tries and also making the Super League "Dream Team" despite his team, the Catalans Dragons coming bottom of the table.

In 2007, Murphy rose to public attention after suffering a spectacular injury in a match against Wigan Warriors. While running to try and claim a chip kick, he was pushed innocuously in the back by Pat Richards and went flying towards the advertising hoardings which surround the pitch. Trying to jump over the danger, his feet caught the hoardings and his neck and back were slammed into the concrete steps at the bottom of the stand. Murphy played on for almost an hour before eventually being substituted, where it was revealed he had broken ribs and he was subsequently sidelined for 6 weeks.

He was part of the French squad for the 2008 World Cup.

Following retirement, Murphy moved to Toowoomba.

References

External links 
 Collected Justin Murphy articles
 Saints top Dream Team nominations
 Vikings swoop for Murphy
 Justin Murphy Bulldogs Profile

1979 births
Living people
AS Saint Estève coaches
Australian rugby league coaches
Australian rugby league players
Canterbury-Bankstown Bulldogs players
Catalans Dragons players
Eastern Tornadoes players
France national rugby league team players
New Zealand Warriors players
Past Brothers players
Rugby league players from Sydney
Rugby league wingers
Widnes Vikings players